The Tenants may refer to:

 The Tenants (novel), a 1971 Bernard Malamud novel
 The Tenants (1986 film), Iranian film
 The Tenants (2005 film), film based on the Malamud novel 
 The Tenants (2009 film), Brazilian film
 The Tenants (band), an Australian band

See also
 Tenant (disambiguation)
 The Tenant (novel), a 1964 French novel by Roland Topor
 The Tenant, a 1976 film by Roman Polanski based on the Topor novel